Pine Mountain is the name of several elevations in New York State:

 Pine Mountain (Otsego County, New York)
 Pine Mountain (Arietta, New York), in Arietta, New York
 Pine Mountain (Essex County, New York)
 Pine Mountain (Hamilton County, New York)
 Pine Mountain (Schoharie County, New York)
 Pine Mountain (Wells, New York), in Hamilton County
 Pine Mountain (Wells, New York 2), in Hamilton County
 Pine Mountain (Wells, New York 3), in Hamilton County